Tayvon Howard Gray (born August 19, 2002) is an American professional soccer player who plays as a right-back for Major League Soccer club New York City FC.

Early life
Gray was born in The Bronx, New York. He attended high school in Hackensack High School and Alexander Hamilton High School, while also playing club soccer at Soccer Domain FC Gunners. At just 9 years old, Gray had trials with Fulham and Tottenham Hotspur. He later joined the Cedar Stars academy. In 2017, Gray joined the New York City FC academy. He is of Jamaican descent.

Professional career

New York City
On November 26, 2019, Gray signed as a homegrown player with Major League Soccer side New York City FC ahead of the 2020 season. This made him the first Bronx native to play for New York City FC. He made the bench 3 times during the 2020 MLS season but did not make an appearance. He made his professional debut on April 24, 2021, appearing as an 83rd-minute substitute during a 5–0 win over FC Cincinnati. Gray consistently made the bench in the first part of the season and made his continental competition debut in a start in the quarterfinals of the 2021 Leagues Cup, playing 88 minutes in the match that NYCFC lost on penalties to UNAM Pumas. After Anton Tinnerholm, NYCFC's starting right back, tore his achilles tendon in a match against Nashville SC on October 10, Gray was able to establish himself as a consistent presence in the lineup. He ended the 2021 season with 10 appearances, 375 minutes, and 1 assist. He then went on to start in all four a NYCFC's playoff matches, playing every minute and recording an assist in their run to the 2021 MLS Cup.

Gray made his CONCACAF Champions League debut in NYCFC's first match of 2022, playing  in a 2-0 win against Costa Rican side Santos de Guápiles.

International career
Gray has represented the United States at various youth levels.

Career statistics

Club

Honors
New York City FC
MLS Cup: 2021
Campeones Cup: 2022

References

External links

Tayvon Gray at New York City FC

Living people
2002 births
American soccer players
American sportspeople of Jamaican descent
Association football defenders
Homegrown Players (MLS)
Major League Soccer players
New York City FC players
Sportspeople from the Bronx
Soccer players from New York City
United States men's youth international soccer players